Music from and Inspired by Spider-Man is a 2002 soundtrack album for the film Spider-Man. Although it contains a portion of the film score by Danny Elfman, a more complete album of Elfman's work was released as Spider-Man: Original Motion Picture Score. "All in the Suit That You Wear" by the group Stone Temple Pilots was pulled out at the last minute when they could not get it as the lead track.

Track listing 
Credits adapted from the album's liner notes.

(*) Asian edition bonus track

(**) Indonesian edition bonus track

Use in other works 
As a tribute to the film, "Weird Al" Yankovic's album Poodle Hat contains the song "Ode to a Superhero", in which he takes the plot of this film but recites it to the tune of Billy Joel's "Piano Man".

Chart positions

Weekly charts

Year-end charts

Certifications

References 

2002 soundtrack albums
2000s film soundtrack albums
Spider-Man (2002 film series)
Spider-Man film soundtracks
Columbia Records soundtracks
Sony Music soundtracks
Roadrunner Records soundtracks